A Merry Little Christmas may refer to:

A Merry Little Christmas (Linda Ronstadt album), 2000
A Merry Little Christmas (Matt Brouwer album), 2010
A Merry Little Christmas (Mormon Tabernacle Choir album), 2018
A Merry Little Christmas (EP), by Lady Antebellum, 2010

See also
Have Yourself a Merry Little Christmas (disambiguation)
"Merry Little Christmas", an episode of House
Merry Little Christmas, an EP by Albin Lee Meldau, 2019